Crnče is a village in the municipality of Bela Palanka, Serbia. According to the 2002 census, the village has a population of  64 people. The village has a slight connection with big-serving tennis ace Ivo Karlović as his father came from a nearby farm.  Ivo has often returned to the area however since a confrontation with local police over an alleged incident of exposure he has ceased such visits until such time as he receives an official apology and retraction of the allegation.

References

Populated places in Pirot District